Reba Hore (1926–2008) was an Indian artist and activist. She has worked in various mediums ranging from water colors, mixed media, oil paints, pastels to terracotta. Her artworks were spontaneous, deeply personal and rooted in her daily life experiences. She was the wife of Somnath Hore, an accomplished sculptor and print maker himself.

Life 
Reba had completed her graduation in economics and became a member of the Communist Party in 1948. Later, she joined the Government College of Art & Craft in Kolkata. After completing her studies, she started teaching art at St. John's Diocesan School from 1951. It was three years later, when she married Somnath Hore in 1954.

She lived and worked in different cities, namely Kolkata, New Delhi and Shantiniketan over the course of her life. Hore passed away in 2008.

Career 
Hore was mostly under the shadow of her husband. However, the incredible number of artworks created in a style of her own make her stand out.

Style and influences 
Reba Hore's works describe her emotional responses to the stimuli of her day-to-day life experiences. These stimuli might be as simple as the animals in her courtyard, the everyday lives of the people, and the folk zest of the Shantiniketan where she had spent her entire life. In other cases, they might be the spine-chilling and emotional portrayal of momentous human tragedies like the Bengal famine, which was contemporary to her times.

The depictions in her paintings are deeply introspective comprehensions of the universal human drama. It reminds us, time and again, that ‘no man is an island’. Hore's work was universal which made her an artist of the people. She was also a preeminent creator and a master of the strong descriptive line. The lines & colors in her dry pastels & mixed media works seem to be hastily put together. Yet with a few apparently rough and spontaneous strokes, she evokes an entire emotional universe.

Collections 

 The Seagull Foundation for the Arts, Kolkata
 Birla Academy of Art and Culture, Kolkata
 Lalit Kala Akademi, New Delhi
 Art Heritage, New Delhi
 Netherlands Embassy, New Delhi

Exhibitions 

 2022 - In Luminous Tenderness, Birla Academy Of Art and Culture, By Golf Green Art Gallery, Kolkata
 2021 - The Broken Foot Journal and Other Stories, Experimenter Gallery, Ballygunge Place, Kolkata
 2016 - The Overwhelming Imagination : The Junction of Interactivity, Art Konsult, New Delhi
 2011 - Art of the Land & Land in Art, Galerie 88, Kolkata
 2006 - Reba Hore, Gallery Sumukha, Bangalore
 1956-58 - Joint show with her husband, Somnath Hore

References 

2008 deaths
20th-century Indian women artists
1926 births
Artists from Kolkata
Indian women painters
Women artists from West Bengal
Indian women sculptors